Abderrazak Sebgag (born 19 January 1967) is the Algerian Minister of Youth and Sports. He was appointed as minister on 7 July 2021.

Education 
Sebgag holds a diploma from the École nationale d'administration.

References 

1967 births
Living people
21st-century Algerian politicians
Algerian politicians
Government ministers of Algeria
Youth ministers of Algeria
Sports ministers of Algeria
École nationale d'administration alumni